Suddha Dibyaratana, Princess of Rattanakosin (14 September 1877 – 2 January 1922), was the Princess of Siam (later Thailand). She was a member of the Siamese royal family. She was given the highest rank of any daughter of Chulalongkorn, King Rama V of Siam.

Her mother was Queen Sukhumala Marasri, fourth Queen Consort and half-sister of King Chulalongkorn. She had a younger brother, Paribatra Sukhumbandhu, the Prince of Nakhon Sawan. Her full given name was Suddha Dibyaratana Sukhumkhattiya Galyavadi (. She was, if not, one of the most beautiful princesses out of all the King's daughters.

On 9 August 1906, she was given the royal title of The Princess of Rattanakosin, translated in Thai as Krommaluang Si Rattanakosin. She was the only daughter given the rank of Krommaluang, the 3rd level of the Krom ranks.

Royal duties
She was one of the executive vice-presidents of the Red Unalom Society, the major humanitarian organisation (later Thai Red Cross Society), founded by Queen Savang Vadhana as maternal patron. Queen Saovabha Phongsri was appointed the first president, and Thanpuying Plien Phasakoravongs acted as the society secretary. Suddha Dibyaratana worked as the executive vice-president with the other princesses;

 Queen Sukhumala Marasri
 Princess Yaovamalaya Narumala, the Princess of Sawankalok
 Princess Chandra Saradavara, the Princess of Phichit
 Princess Srivilailaksana, the Princess of Suphanburi
 Princess Ubolratana Narinaka, the Princess Akaravorarajgalya
 Princess Saisavalibhirom, the Princess Suddhasininat Piyamaharaj Padivaradda
 The Noble Consort (Chao Chom Manda) Kesorn of King Chulalongkorn

When she turned 40 years old in 1917, Suddha Dibyaratana gave 200,000 bahts to the Thai Red Cross Society, for building Chulalongkorn Hospital, to honour to her father. When the hospital was completed, she named the building Suddhathip 2463. At present, the Chulalongkorn Hospital uses this building as the Nursing College.

Later life
After her father's death in 1910, she moved from her own residence in the Grand Palace to live with her mother, Queen Sukhumala Marasri and her younger brother, Paribatra Sukhumbandhu, the Prince of Nakhon Sawan. In later life, Princess Suddha Dibyaratana suffered from many ailments, including asthma. She died of pulmonary tuberculosis on 2 January 1922 at King Chulalongkorn Memorial Hospital in Bangkok.

Royal decorations
  Dame of The Ancient and Auspicious Order of the Nine Gems: received 9 August 1906
  Dame of The Most Illustrious Order of the Royal House of Chakri: received 6 January 1887
  Dame Cross of the Most Illustrious Order of Chula Chom Klao (First class): received 26 November 1893
  King Rama IV Royal Cypher Medal, Second Class
  King Rama V Royal Cypher Medal, First Class
  King Rama VI Royal Cypher Medal, First Class

Ancestry

References
 Royal Command giving title HRH Princess Suddha Dibyaratana, the Princess of Ratanakosin
 Death of HRH Princess of Rattanakosin
 HRH Princess Suddha Dibyaratana, Krom Luang Sri Ratanakosindra

1877 births
1922 deaths
19th-century Thai women
19th-century Chakri dynasty
20th-century Thai women
20th-century Chakri dynasty
Thai female Chao Fa
Dames Grand Cross of the Order of Chula Chom Klao
20th-century deaths from tuberculosis
Children of Chulalongkorn
Tuberculosis deaths in Thailand
Daughters of kings